The Kiev Gubernatorial Committee of the Communist Party of Ukraine, commonly referred to as the Kiev CPU gubkom. In 1917 it was preceded by Kiev Military Revolutionary Committee of Bolsheviks and in 1918-1921 as Kiev Gubernatorial Revolutionary Committee.

The Kiev Milrevkom was created by Bolsheviks on 9 November 1917 as the Kiev Military Revolutionary Committee as part of 1917 Kiev Bolshevik Uprising which followed the Petrograd Bolshevik putsch. To keep the order in the city and region, the Central Council of Ukraine which was granted a self-rule over Ukraine by the Russian Provisional Government created the Regional Committee in Protection of Revolution in Ukraine and allowed to participate all political faction of the city and governorate. At the same time the Central Council of Ukraine had its own Gubernatorial Commissars in each governorate.

The post was finally established in the summer of 1919 and existed along with the revolutionary committee until 1921.

With elimination of the governorate division in 1925, the committee ceased to exist and was replaced by the Kiev District (Okruha) Committee.

Chairmen
The following individuals served as chairpersons of the Kiev Milrevkom, Kiev Revkom and Kiev Gubernatorial Committee.

Kiev Military Revolutionary Committee (1917)

Kiev Revolutionary Committee (1918-1921)

Kiev Gubernatorial Committee (1918-1920)

Executive Secretaries

Kiev Gubernatorial Committee (1920-1925)

Districts

In 1923 the Ukrainian SSR was split into okruhas (not to be confused with okrugs).

The Kiev Governorate was initially split into 7 okruhas centered in following cities: Bila Tserkva, Berdychiv, Kiev, Malyn, Uman, Cherkasy, and Korsun (as Shevchenko Okruha).

Kiev District Committee (1925-1930)

Bila Tserkva District Committee (1925-1930)

See also
Administrative divisions of Ukraine (1918–1925)
Governor of Kiev Oblast
Kiev City Committee of the Communist Party of Ukraine
Kiev Regional Committee of the Communist Party of Ukraine

External links
Kiev Governorate at the Handbook on history of the Communist Party and the Soviet Union 1898–1991

Organization of the Communist Party of Ukraine (Soviet Union)
Ukrainian Soviet Socialist Republic
History of Kyiv Oblast
Communist Party of Ukraine (Soviet Union)
Branches of the Communist Party of the Soviet Union
Organization of the Communist Party of the Soviet Union
1917 establishments in Russia
1930 disestablishments in the Soviet Union